The post of Leader of the Labour Party was created in 1928. Before this (1921–28) the post was known as President of the Camera del Lavoro (Labour Party).

†Although technically leader of the Labour Party, they only assumed this role because of the resignation of the incumbent leader and were not elected to the post.